Guarujá is a neighbourhood (bairro) in the city of Porto Alegre, the state capital of Rio Grande do Sul, in Brazil. It was created by Law 2022 from December 7, 1959.

External links
 Porto Alegre City Homepage

Neighbourhoods in Porto Alegre
Populated places established in 1959